Claudio León Gruenberg Solari (born 8 April 2000) is a Peruvian footballer who plays as a midfielder.

Career

Club career
Gruenberg is a product of Deportivo Municipal. In the summer 2019, he was loaned out to Peruvian Segunda División club Unión Huaral, where he made a total off two appearances.

On 1 February 2022, Gruenberg signed with Spanish Tercera División side CF Calamocha. He got his debut for the club on 20 February 2022 against CD Cariñena. He left the club at the end of the season.

References

External links
 

Living people
2000 births
Association football midfielders
Peruvian footballers
Peruvian expatriate footballers
Peruvian Segunda División players
Deportivo Municipal footballers
Unión Huaral footballers
Peruvian expatriate sportspeople in Spain
Expatriate footballers in Spain